The 1889 All-Ireland Senior Hurling Championship Final was a hurling match that was played at St.Patrick's GAA Field, Dublin on 1 November 1889 to determine the winners of the 1889 All-Ireland Senior Hurling Championship, the second season of the All-Ireland Senior Hurling Championship, a tournament organised by the Gaelic Athletic Association for the champion teams of Leinster and Munster. The final was contested by Dublin of Leinster and Clare of Munster, with Dublin winning by 5–1 to 1–6.

The All-Ireland final between Clare and Dublin was a unique occasion as it was the first championship meeting between the two teams.

Match

Details

References

1
All-Ireland Senior Hurling Championship Finals
Clare county hurling team matches
Dublin county hurling team matches
November 1889 sports events